Beck is a Swedish crime drama movie series, based on characters featured in the Martin Beck novels of Maj Sjöwall and Per Wahlöö, starring Peter Haber as the titular character. The first three series and two specials were released direct-to-video, with a small number of episodes also concurrently released theatrically. To date, forty-six episodes have been filmed, with all episodes from the fourth series onwards broadcast on C More.

The first series was written entirely by Rolf Börjlind, while several episodes in series two and three, and the two specials, were co-written by Rolf and Cilla Börjlind. From the books, the character of Kollberg is entirely omitted from the TV series. Mikael Persbrandt announced in 2015 that he would be leaving the series to focus on other projects, although he did return to film Gunvald, the first episode of series six. In 2015, the series was acquired by the BBC as part of their international crime drama slate. The first episode to be broadcast was Buried Alive, on BBC Four.
Previous episodes can be seen on STV Player.

Cast
 Peter Haber as Martin Beck
 Mikael Persbrandt as Gunvald Larsson (Series 1–6)
 Malin Birgerson as Alice Levander (Series 2)
 Kristofer Hivju as Steinar Hovland (Series 6–)
 Jennie Silfverhjelm as Alexandra 'Alex' Beijer (Series 7–)
 Rebecka Hemse as Inger Beck
 Ingvar Hirdwall as Valdemar, Martin Beck's neighbour
 Valter Skarsgård as Vilhelm Beck (Series 8–)
 Tommy Wättring as Vilhelm Beck (Series 4–7)
 Neil Bourguiba as Vilhelm Beck (Series 3)
 Peter Hüttner as Oljelund (Series 2–4)
 Bo Höglund as Mats the waiter (Series 1–4)
 Stina Rautelin as Lena Klingström (Series 1, 3–4)
 Marie Göranzon as Margareta Oberg (Series 2–3)
 Måns Nathanaelson as Oskar Bergman (Series 3–)
 Anna Asp as Jenny Bodén (Series 5–)
 Elmira Arikan as Ayda Çetin (Series 5–)
 Jonas Karlsson as Klas Fredén (Series 5–)
 Åsa Karlin as Andrea Bergström (Series 5–)
 Martin Wallström as Josef Eriksson (Series 8–)
 Fredrik Ohlsson as Fredrik Ohlsson (Series 2)
 Joakim Nätterqvist as Peter Rosenberg (Series 9)

Episodes

Series 1 (1997–1998)

Series 2 (2001–2002)

Series 3 (2006–2007)

Specials (2009–2010)

Series 4 (2015)

Series 5 (2016)

Series 6 (2018)

Series 7 (2020–2021)

Series 8 (2021–2022)

Series 9 (2022–2023)
In February 2022, the shooting of four Beck films began in Stockholm. (Beck 47-50)

Home Video
MHZ Choice DVD released Beck on DVD in the U.S.A.
Volume 01 = episodes # 1,2,3
Volume 02 = episodes # 4,5,6
Volume 03 = episodes # 7,8,9
Volume 04 = episodes # 10,11,12
Volume 05 = episodes # 13,14,15
Volume 06 = episodes # 16,17,18
Volume 07 = episodes # 19,20,21
Volume 08 = episodes # 22,23,24
Volume 09 = episodes # 25,26,27
Volume 10 = episodes # 28,29,30,31
Volume 11 = episodes # 32,33,34
Volume 12 = episodes # 35,36,37,38

MHZ Choice Network streams seasons 1 through 8 in the U.S.A.

References

External links

1997 Swedish television series debuts
1990s Swedish television series
2000s Swedish television series
2010s Swedish television series
Swedish crime television series
Swedish drama television series
Television shows set in Sweden
Swedish-language television shows
Television film series